The 2019–20 Russian Cup was the 28th season of the Russian football knockout tournament since the dissolution of the Soviet Union.

The competition started 19 July 2019, but suspended on 17 March 2020 due to the COVID-19 pandemic in Russia.

Lokomotiv Moscow was the reigning cup-holder, winning its eighth Russian Cup in 2018–19, defeating Ural Yekaterinburg in the final, 1–0. However, Lokomotiv was eliminated in the round of 32 after it was defeated by Baltika Kaliningrad (1–1 after extra time and 1–4 by penalty shootout. 

Lokomotiv Moscow has the most Russian Cup championships in history, followed by CSKA Moscow (7), Spartak Moscow and Zenit Saint Petersburg (3 each).

First round
West-Center

Center-West

South

Ural

Second round
West-Center

Center-West

South

Ural

East

Third round
West-Center

Center-West

South

Ural

East

Fourth round

Round of 32

Round of 16

Quarter-finals

Semi-finals

Final

References

External links
 Official page

Russian Cup seasons
Cup
Russian Cup
Russian